Radiacmea intermedia  is a species of small sea snail or true limpet, a marine  gastropod mollusc in the family Lottiidae, one of the true limpet families.

References

 Powell A. W. B., William Collins Publishers Ltd, Auckland 1979 

Lottiidae
Gastropods of New Zealand
Gastropods described in 1907